Bradina angustalis is a moth in the family Crambidae. It was described by Hiroshi Yamanaka in 1984. It is found in China and Japan.

Subspecies
Bradina angustalis angustalis (China)
Bradina angustalis pryeri Yamanaka, 1984 (Japan)
Bradina angustalis ryukyuensis Yamanaka, 1984 (Japan: Ryukyus)

References

Moths described in 1984
Bradina